Tomasz Noah Skublak (born 8 December 1997) is a Canadian soccer player who plays as a forward for Scrosoppi FC in League1 Ontario.

University career
In 2015 and 2016, Skublak attended the University of Guelph, playing for the men's soccer team.

In 2017, he transferred to American school University of South Florida to play for the men's soccer team. In his senior season in 2018, Skublak was an American Athletic Conference All-Academic Team, USF Athletics Honor Roll, United Soccer Coaches NCAA Div. I Men's Soccer Third Team All-Region, United Soccer Coaches Second Team Scholar All-American, First Team All-American Athletic Conference, and a two-time American Athletic Conference Offensive Player of the Week.

Club career
In 2017, Skublak joined K-W United in the Premier Development League. He scored his first goal on June 28 against the West Virginia Chaos.

In 2017 and 2018, Skublak spent summers playing with League1 Ontario side Vaughan Azzurri. In 2017, he scored four goals in nine appearances and then scored another two goals in three appearances in 2018.

Ahead of the 2019 season, he went on trial with Canadian Premier League club York9 FC, but ultimately did not sign with the club. In April 2019, Skublak signed his first professional contract with another Canadian Premier League side, HFX Wanderers. After the season, it was announced that Skublak would not be returning for the 2020 season.

In March 2020, he signed with Armenian club Lori FC.

In September 2020, Skublak signed with German Berlin-Liga side Brandenburg 03. He made his league debut on 19 September 2020 against Füchse Berlin.

In May 2021, Skublak returned to Canada, signing with League1 Ontario side Guelph United.

In the 2022 Fall season, he joined United Premier Soccer League club FC Berlin.

In January 2023, he signed with Scrosoppi FC of League1 Ontario.

Career statistics

References

External links

1997 births
Living people
Association football forwards
Canadian soccer players
Soccer players from Hamilton, Ontario
Canadian people of Polish descent
Canadian expatriate soccer players
Expatriate soccer players in the United States
Canadian expatriate sportspeople in the United States
Expatriate footballers in Germany
Canadian expatriate sportspeople in Germany
South Florida Bulls men's soccer players
HFX Wanderers FC players
League1 Ontario players
Canadian Premier League players
Vaughan Azzurri players
Guelph United F.C. players
K-W United FC players
USL League Two players
United Premier Soccer League players
FC Berlin (Canada/United States) players
Guelph Gryphons men's soccer players
Scrosoppi FC players